Asiatic refers to something related to Asia.

Asiatic may also refer to:
 Asiatic style, a term in ancient stylistic criticism associated with Greek writers of Asia Minor
 In the context of Ancient Egypt, beyond the borders of Egypt and the continent of Africa to the east, but only of western Asia, or of what may now be considered the Middle East
 Asiatic (journal)
 SS Asiatic (1870), a ship

See also
Asian (disambiguation)